Warrant Officer Class One Gavin Henderson Paton  (born March 1979) is a senior British Army soldier. From 2018 to 2021, he served as the Army Sergeant Major, the most senior warrant officer and member of the other ranks in the British Army.

Personal life
Paton was born in March 1979 in Cornwall, England. He is married to Jessica, and together they have one son.

Military career
Paton served as a warrant officer with 3rd Battalion, The Rifles. He was commissioned as a captain on 23 July 2017, and appointed as Field Army Sergeant Major in 2018. He was appointed Army Sergeant Major in November 2018, thereby becoming the most senior member of the other ranks of the British Army.

Paton was appointed an Officer of the Order of the British Empire (OBE) in the 2022 Birthday Honours.

References

 

 
 

1979 births
Army Sergeant Majors
British Army personnel of the Iraq War
British Army personnel of the War in Afghanistan (2001–2021)
Living people
The Rifles officers
The Rifles soldiers